Jack Thornton (1909-1983) was an Australian rugby league footballer who played in the 1920s and 1930s for Newtown in the NSWRL competition.

Playing career
Thornton made his first grade debut in Round 6 1929 against University at Marrickville Oval.  Newtown would go on to reach the 1929 grand final against South Sydney but Thornton was not selected to play in the game.

In 1930, Thornton was selected to play for Metropolis, the earlier version of what is now known as the NSW City team.

In 1933, Thornton played for Newtown in the 1933 NSWRL grand final against St George at the Sydney Sports Ground.  Newtown would win the match 18-5 claiming its second premiership.

Thornton played on in 1934 with Newtown before retiring at the end of the season.

References

External links

1909 births
1983 deaths
Australian rugby league players
Newtown Jets players
Rugby league locks
Rugby league props
Rugby league second-rows
Rugby league players from Sydney
Place of birth missing
Place of death missing